Irifune (written: 入船) is a Japanese surname. Notable people with the surname include:

, Japanese footballer
, Japanese long-distance runner

Japanese-language surnames